Kamer Qaka (born 11 April 1995) is an Albanian professional footballer who plays as a defensive midfielder for Macedonian club Shkëndija.

Club career

Early years / Norway
Qaka was born in Peja, modern-day Kosovo, but when he was two years old his family moved to Norway and settled in Brandbu. In 2010, while still attending lower secondary school, he signed his first professional contract for Norwegian Eliteserien side Vålerenga.

In a May 2010 cup game against Oppsal IF, as Qaka made his professional debut, he became Vålerenga's youngest goalscorer ever. He made his league debut in 2011.

In 2013, he signed for fellow Norwegian club Raufoss. He made his debut on 15 April 2013 against Odd 2 as they won the game 2-1. In January 2014, he joined Hønefoss BK, and a year later he went on to Sarpsborg 08 FF.

In 2016 he tried his luck with Kristiansund BK. His performances paid off when Qaka helped his team get promoted to the Eliteserien, as well as being awarded the trophy for the best player in the league.

Politehnica Iași
On 17 July 2017, after terminating his contract with Kristiansund, Qaka put pen to paper on a two-year deal with Romanian team Politehnica Iași. A week later, he made his competitive debut in a 0–0 Liga I draw with Gaz Metan Mediaș, coming on as a half-time substitute for Dan Spătaru. From the following matchday, Qaka established himself as a starter under head coach Flavius Stoican.

In November 2017, after his international debut for Albania, it was reported that fellow league teams FCSB, CFR Cluj and Universitatea Craiova, as well as Portuguese side Braga, were interested in acquiring the player.

Universitatea Craiova
On 3 June 2019 he signed a 4-years contract with CS Universitatea Craiova.

Return to Shkëndija
On 5 January 2023, Qaka returned to Shkëndija on a two-year contract.

International career
Qaka from 2010 until 2014 has been part of Norway at youth international level, respectively has been part of the U15 and U19 teams and he with these teams played 36 matches, he accepted the invitation from the Albania national team by coach Christian Panucci for the friendly match against Turkey on 13 November 2017 as a replacement for the injured Amir Abrashi. He debuted for Albania against Turkey as a 67th minute substitute for Odise Roshi in a 2–3 away win for his side.

Career statistics

Club

International

Honours

Club
Sarpsborg 08
Norwegian Football Cup: Runner-up 2015

Kristiansund
OBOS-ligaen: 2016

References

External links

1995 births
Living people
Sportspeople from Peja
Albanian footballers
Albania international footballers
Albanian expatriate footballers
Albanian expatriate sportspeople in Norway
Albanian expatriate sportspeople in Romania
Albanian expatriate sportspeople in North Macedonia
Albanian expatriate sportspeople in Hungary
Norwegian footballers
Norway youth international footballers
Norwegian expatriate sportspeople in Romania
Norwegian expatriate sportspeople in North Macedonia
Norwegian expatriate sportspeople in Hungary
Norwegian people of Kosovan descent
Norwegian people of Albanian descent
Kosovan footballers
Kosovan expatriate footballers
Kosovan expatriate sportspeople in Norway
Kosovan expatriate sportspeople in Romania
Kosovan expatriate sportspeople in North Macedonia
Kosovan expatriate sportspeople in Hungary
Association football midfielders
Norwegian Second Division players
Norwegian First Division players
Eliteserien players
Vålerenga Fotball players
Raufoss IL players
Hønefoss BK players
Sarpsborg 08 FF players
Kristiansund BK players
Kongsvinger IL Toppfotball players
Liga I players
FC Politehnica Iași (2010) players
FC Steaua București players
CS Universitatea Craiova players
Macedonian First Football League players
KF Shkëndija players
Mezőkövesdi SE footballers
Nemzeti Bajnokság I players